James "Cannonball" Butler (May 4, 1943 – February 10, 2014) was an American professional football player who was a running back for eight seasons in the National Football League (NFL), with the Pittsburgh Steelers, the Atlanta Falcons and the St. Louis Cardinals.  Butler grew up in Delray Beach, Florida and played college football at Edward Waters College in Jacksonville, Florida. To this day, he is the only alumnus from the school to ever play in the NFL.

In the NFL, Butler was the leading rusher for the Atlanta Falcons in each of his four seasons with the team (1968-1971), and was selected to the Pro Bowl in 1969.

References

External links
 

1943 births
2014 deaths
American football running backs
Atlanta Falcons players
Edward Waters Tigers football players
National Football League announcers
Pittsburgh Steelers players
St. Louis Cardinals (football) announcers
St. Louis Cardinals (football) players
Western Conference Pro Bowl players
Sportspeople from Delray Beach, Florida
People from Quincy, Florida